The 1935 Wellington City mayoral election was part of the New Zealand local elections held that same year. In 1935, elections were held for the Mayor of Wellington plus other local government positions including fifteen city councillors. The polling was conducted using the standard first-past-the-post electoral method.

Background
Incumbent mayor Thomas Hislop stood for a third-term, the first mayor to do so since Sir John Luke in 1915. During the campaign Semple received slanderous allegations of being an Atheist, which he denied stating "If the people of the world followed the philosophy of Jesus there would be no poverty...".

For the second election in a row Labour won a majority of the vote, but could not win a majority of seats. However Labour did win one more seat than in 1933 and then went on to win a by-election soon after increase their representation further.

Mayoralty results

Councillor results

 
 
 
 
 
 
 
 
 
 
 
 
 
 
 
 
 
 
 
 
 
 
 
 
 
 
 
  

 
 
 

Table footnotes:
<noinclude>

Notes

References

Mayoral elections in Wellington
1935 elections in New Zealand
Politics of the Wellington Region
1930s in Wellington